Sibérie m'était contéee  (translated as "if [the story of] Siberia was told/recited to me", but see Puns and wordplay below) is the third studio album and first exclusively French language album by Manu Chao, released in 2004. This album features, along with a CD, an oversized book with lyrics to songs from the album and previous Manu Chao albums, as well as illustrations by Jacek Woźniak. Hit singles include "Petite blonde du Boulevard Brune" ("Little blonde from Brune Boulevard", which is a Parisian boulevard). The album's songs refer heavily to Paris, and Parisian life. The song "Helno est mort" ("Helno is Dead") is dedicated to the memory of his friend Helno (Noël Rota), the singer of Les Négresses Vertes who died of a drug overdose in 1993.

Spelling of the title

Note that the title incorporates an intentional misspelling (contéee instead of contée). It may or may not incorporate an intentional dropping of acute accents in Sibérie/Siberie and m'était/m'etait.

The grammatically correct title would be Sibérie m'était contée. The title as written in capital letters on the album cover is SIBERIE M'ETAIT CONTÉEE. To interpret this, it is necessary to understand that the French language usually drops accents (diacritics) on capital letters, but nevertheless very often retains the accent for capital É (E with acute accent) when it occurs in a word-final or near word-final position, because in this position it could be mistaken for silent "e" and the word could be mistaken for another word: e.g., conté (told [masculine]), conte (tale).

Thus, nearly all French language references interpret the title as Sibérie m'était contéee (Amazon.fr, album reviews, etc).  However the official Manu Chao website manuchao.net gives the title as Siberie m'etait contéee (without accents on Sibérie or m'était) even though Sibérie appears elsewhere on the same webpage with the accent.  It is not known if this dropping of accents in Sibérie and m'était actually reflects the singer's intentions or was merely done by the site's webmaster.

Puns and wordplay

The title is a pun or word play.  There are many books or articles in French with the title "Si X m'était conté" or "Si le X m'était conté" (for masculine nouns X) or "Si X m'était contée" or "Si la X m'était contée" (for feminine nouns X).  These translate literally as "If X was told to me" or figuratively as "What X is all about" or "An introduction to X".  Thus in Sibérie m'était contée the first syllable of Sibérie (Siberia) could be interpreted, in wordplay, as the word si (if): "If 'bérie' was told to me" (whatever "bérie" might be - it may, given the themes of the album, be a reference to Paris itself).

Note also a 1974 album by Melina Mercouri with the title Si Melina m'était contée.

The album cover also includes the words (in capital letters): "…A TOUS LES PECHEURS DU FLEUVE AMOUR…", which is also a pun.  It can be understood as either "to all those who fish the Amur river" (a river in Siberia), or as "to all the sinners of the river Love".  The French words pécheur (sinner) and pêcheur (fisherman/fisher) are spelled the same way when the accent is dropped in capital letters.

Track listing
"Le P'tit Jardin"
"Petite Blonde du Boulevard Brune"
"La Valse à Sale Temps"
"Les Milles Paillettes"
"Il Faut Manger"
"Helno Est Mort"
"J'ai Besoin de La Lune"
"L'automne Est Las"
"Si Loin de Toi... Je Te Joue"
"100.000 remords"
"Trop Tôt, Trop Tard"
"Te Tromper"
"Madame Banquise"
"Les Rues de L'Hiver"
"Sibérie Fleuve Amour"
"Les Petites Planètes"
"Te Souviens Tu..."
"J'ai Besoin de La Lune... Remix"
"Dans Mon Jardin"
"Merci Bonsoir..."
"Fou de Toi"
"Les Yeux Turquoises"
"...Sibérie..."

2004 albums
Manu Chao albums
French-language albums